Head of the Deceiver is an album by the German power metal band Wizard, released in 2001.

Track listing
All songs written & arranged by: Wizard

"Evitum Okol" - 0:59
"Magic Potion" - 4:24
"Head of the Deceiver" - 4:50
"Collective Mind" - 4:42
"Defenders of Metal" - 4:32
"Calm of the Storm" - 5:04
"Demon Witches" - 4:41
"Iron War" - 3:22
"The First One" - 4:43
"Revenge" - 3:42
"True Metal" - 6:41

Album line-up
 Sven D'Anna – vocals  
 Michael Maass – guitar  
 Volker Leson – bass  
 Sören van Heek – drums

2001 albums
Wizard (German band) albums
Limb Music albums